This is a list of top Private Universities in Uganda.

Private universities

Public universities

13.              BU.                     Busoga University.  Iganga

Military universities

Other degree-awarding institutions

See also
 Education in Uganda
 List of business schools in Uganda
 List of law schools in Uganda
 List of medical schools in Uganda
 List of university leaders in Uganda

References

External links
31 Universities Fail To Acquire Charter - NCHE
2014 rankings of universities in Uganda at Webometrics.info
 Uganda Has 30 public and private universities as of March 2012
 Ugandan universities improve in ranking - August 2014
  Colleges and universities in Uganda

 
Universities
Uganda
Uganda